Shishovka is a rural locality (a village) in Yugskoye Rural Settlement, Cherepovetsky District, Vologda Oblast, Russia. The population was 121 as of 2002.

Geography 
Shishovka is located 76 km southeast of Cherepovets (the district's administrative centre) by road. Chikeyevo is the nearest rural locality.

References 

Rural localities in Cherepovetsky District